is a former Japanese football player.

Club career
Takada was born in Yokohama on February 22, 1979. He joined Bellmare Hiratsuka (later Shonan Bellmare) from youth team in 1997. He debuted in 1998. From 1999, he played many matches in the team with many young players for due to financial strain end of 1998 season. The club was relegated to J2 League end of 1999 season. He became a regular player from 2001. However his opportunity to play decreased in 2005 and he moved to Yokohama FC in September 2005. In 2006, he moved to Thespa Kusatsu and played as regular player. He retired end of 2010 season.

National team career
In April 1999, Takada was selected Japan U-20 national team for 1999 World Youth Championship. At this tournament, he played 3 matches and Japan won the 2nd place.

Club statistics

Honors and awards
 FIFA World Youth Championship runner-up: 1999

References

External links

1979 births
Living people
Association football people from Kanagawa Prefecture
Japanese footballers
Japan youth international footballers
J1 League players
J2 League players
Shonan Bellmare players
Yokohama FC players
Thespakusatsu Gunma players
Association football forwards